Wildeye, also known as Finland 1944, is a 2015 Finnish romantic war drama film directed by Antti Jokinen. It is an adaptation of Finnish author Katja Kettu's bestselling 2011 novel The Midwife (Kätilö) set before and during Lapland War. The film stars Krista Kosonen and Lauri Tilkanen with Pirkka-Pekka Petelius, Leea Klemola, Seppo Pääkkönen, Elina Knihtilä, Tommi Korpela, and Johannes Brotherus in supporting roles. The film tells the story about a love affair between a Lapp midwife and a SS officer set against the backdrop of the Lapland War, which opposed Finnish and German armies in 1944–45. The film won the Best Film and the Best Actress awards at the 2015 Waterloo International Historical Film Festival and the Best Actress award at the 2015 Shanghai International Film Festival.

Cast 
 Krista Kosonen as Helena
 Lauri Tilkanen as Johannes
 Pirkka-Pekka Petelius as Jouni
 Leea Klemola as Aune
 Seppo Pääkkönen as Björne
 Elina Knihtilä as Heta
 Tommi Korpela as a Nazi SS officer Gödel
 Johannes Brotherus as Aleksei

Production
Principal photography began in Lithuania on 13 May 2014. Krista Kosonen who plays female lead, Helena, cut her hair on camera for the role. She also learned Finnish dialect from Katja Kettu's novel. Many cast members change their physical appearances; Tommi Korpela lost 44 pounds for his role as a SS officer; Elina Knihtilä lost 22 pounds for her character Heta, prisoner of war. On 10 April 2015 Jokinen informed in an interview that the production of the film was finished and that the film was complete.

Accolades

References

External links 
 

2015 films
2010s Finnish-language films
Finnish war drama films
Finnish historical films
Finnish drama films
2015 war drama films
Films based on Finnish novels
Films set in 1944
Films set in 1945
Films about Nazi Germany
Films set in Finland
Films shot in Lithuania
Films shot in Norway
Finnish World War II films
Films directed by Antti Jokinen
2015 drama films